The International Francophone Press Union (UPF) is a Francophone association of journalists.  Founded in 1950, it is the world's oldest Francophone organisation,
and has more than 3,000 members in 110 countries.

History
The association was founded in 1950 in Limoges, France on the initiative of Canadian journalist Émile-Dostaler O'Leary, who served as the organisation's first president.
It formally changed its name from Union internationale des journalistes et de la presse de langue français to Union internationale de la presse francophone on October 24, 2001, at its 33rd meeting in Beirut, Lebanon.

Activities
The UPF's aim is to advance cooperation between the Francophone media of the world.  Although initially a venue for French-speaking journalists to convene, over time the UPF became a professional union.  It is an international nongovernmental organisation recognised by the European Parliament, La Francophonie, and the United Nations, among others.

Prix de la libre expression
In 1991, the association (at the time still known as the UIJPLF), in cooperation with La Francophonie, created the Prix de la libre expression.
The prize is awarded annually to journalists who remain objective despite harassment or persecution.  Past recipients of the prize include Michel Auger (2000), Le Rénovateur (2003), and May Chidiac (2005).

Leadership
As of August 2008, Alfred Dan Moussa of Côte d'Ivoire is the president of the UPF.

See also
 Agence France-Presse

References

External links
 Official website

International organizations based in France
International journalism organizations
Organizations established in 1950
1950 establishments in France
French language